José Quer y Martínez (1695–1764), was a Spanish doctor and botanist. This botanist is denoted by the author abbreviation Quer when citing a botanical name.

Biography 
Quer studied medicine and surgery in his hometown of Perpignan, where he was born in 1695, with particular emphasis on botany. He later joined the army, where. as a military surgeon, he traveled extensively in Spain, France, Italy and northern Africa (where he took part in the operation to capture Oran), prepared herbarium specimens, and collected a large quantity of seeds and living plants. With these he established a botanical garden in 1755 which has evolved into today's Real Jardín Botánico de Madrid.

In 1762 he launched the publication of his Spanish Flora and history of the plants that are grown in Spain, (which led him to correspond with Carl Linnaeus). He published only four volumes of this work before his death. It was completed one of his successors, Casimiro Gomez Ortega. Quer published two lectures, one on the "Uva ursi or gayuba" (1763) and the other on the "Cicuta" (1764).

References

Links 
 Josep Quer i Martínez | Galeria de Metges Catalans  in Catalan

Botanists with author abbreviations
18th-century Spanish botanists
1695 births
1764 deaths